Rochonia is a genus of Madagascarian plants in the tribe Astereae within the family Asteraceae.

 Species
 Rochonia cinerarioides DC.
 Rochonia cuneata DC.
 formerly included
see Aster Madagaster 
 Rochonia aspera Humbert - Aster andringitrensis Humbert
 Rochonia senecionoides Baker - Madagaster senecionoides (Baker) G.L.Nesom

References

Asteraceae genera
Astereae
Endemic flora of Madagascar